The 1946 Louisville Cardinals football team was an American football team that represented the University of Louisville as a member of the Kentucky Intercollegiate Athletic Conference (KIAC) during the 1946 college football season. In their first season under head coach Frank Camp, the Cardinals compiled an overall record of 6–2 with a mark of 2–2 in conference play, placing fourth in the KIAC.

Schedule

References

Louisville
Louisville Cardinals football seasons
Louisville Cardinals football